Lairdsville is an unincorporated community in Franklin Township, Lycoming County, Pennsylvania, United States.

References

Unincorporated communities in Lycoming County, Pennsylvania
Unincorporated communities in Pennsylvania